To promote "Local Self-Governance" of the Industrial Areas, TSIIC has evolved the concept of Industrial Areas Service Societies involving the taxpayer's community in the Notified Industrial Areas in the Management/Maintenance of Industrial Areas.

Functions

1. Carrying our some statutory powers or functions of local bodies such as evaluation, levy and collect government taxes, sanctioning building structure permits, removal of encroachments, and carrying on civic services in the industrial parks.

2. Officers are nominated to carry on the duties as per the powers designated by the State Government.

3. To ensure and promote Local Self Governance.

4. Enable Online services to ensure businesses are carried out easily within the industrial areas.

References

Infrastructure in India
State agencies of Andhra Pradesh
State industrial development corporations of India
Economy of Andhra Pradesh